John Rost (born April 19, 1964) is an American sports shooter. He competed in the men's 10 metre air rifle event at the 1984 Summer Olympics.

References

External links
 

1964 births
Living people
American male sport shooters
Olympic shooters of the United States
Shooters at the 1984 Summer Olympics
Sportspeople from Cincinnati